The Sunshine Canyon Landfill is a large landfill located in the Los Angeles neighborhood of Sylmar, just south of Newhall Pass. The landfill was commissioned in 1958 and serves Los Angeles County.

Description
Sunshine Canyon receives one-third of the daily waste, approximately 8,300 tons (7,530 metric tonnes), produced by of Los Angeles and the surrounding cities. The landfill is also home to a 23.5 MW biogas power station that was commissioned in 2013.

See also
Scholl Canyon Landfill
List of power stations in California

References

External links
Sunshine Canyon Landfill website

Landfills in California
Power stations in California